Yau Yiu Ting (born 26 December 1988), better known by his stage name Zight, is an electronic dance music (EDM) producer and songwriter from Hong Kong.

Zight landed his first international collaboration "Fly Away" with British singer Sonna Rele in 2021.

During a radio interview, Zight revealed that his stage name was derived from his middle name "light". He first applied his alias Zight on BeatStars because the user-name "light" has been registered by another user.

Early life
Zight was born and raised in British Hong Kong. During a live interview, he mentioned a huge vinyl and CD cabinet of his father, which contains very diverse genres of Western music. Among the many genres of music, Eurodance was his particular favorite. He was a fan of Eurodance groups such as Vengaboys, Aqua and 2 Unlimited. He explained that his childhood interest in Eurodance music lead him to become an electronic music producer after his graduation from music school.

Zight studied creative media and music production at the City University of Hong Kong. During his college days, he started selling beats and rhythms to hip hop artists on BeatStars, where he first applied Zight as his stage name.

Career
After his graduation from college, Zight spent several years to make music behind the scenes for local musicians and Japanese hip hop groups. In 2018, he visited London to further study electronic music at Point Blank Music School. Later in 2020, he released his first electronic music single, "Paradise".

In 2021, he landed his first international collaboration, "Fly Away" with British singer Sonna Rele. The song was published by U-NXT, a subdivision of Universal Music Group to empower new electronic music artists. The music video was shot in Ukraine, which has gained over 1.7 million views on YouTube as of November 2022.

On 1 October 2021, Zight released his third single, "Everybody Keep Running" with Canadian singer Peter Forest. The music video took place in Cape Town, featuring Sibusiso Madikizela, a national marathon athlete from South Africa. The song was later nominated and selected into the Asian electronic music compilation Billboard Electric Asia Vol. 5.

In 2022, Zight released his sixth single, "Number One" with American singer Adam Christopher. The music video was shot at Winton Motor Raceway, a motor racing track near Melbourne, Australia.

In July 2022, Zight released his seventh single, "Work It Harder" with American pop singer Chris Willis and Italian DJ duo Maximals. During an interview, Zight revealed that the music video was an implication to support Ukraine in the Russo-Ukrainian War.

Singles
As lead artist

As featured artist

References

External links
 
 Zight on YouTube
 Zight on Instagram

Living people

1988 births
Alumni of the City University of Hong Kong
Hong Kong songwriters
Hong Kong record producers
Hong Kong DJs
21st-century Hong Kong musicians
Chinese electronic musicians
Electronic dance music DJs
Electro house musicians
Progressive house musicians
Future house musicians
Universal Music Group artists